Anas Farah Ali (born 3 March 2000) is a professional footballer who plays as a midfielder for Moss. Born in Norway, he represents the Djibouti national team.

Club career 
As a youth Ali played for Trosvik IF and Selbak TIF. He later joined the academy of Fredrikstad FK and was promoted to the senior squad in 2015. He was subsequently sent out on loan to Grorud IL in 2019 and Egersunds IK in 2021.

International career 
Ali represented Norway in 2017 UEFA European Under-17 Championship qualification, appearing in three matches. He has represented Norway from under-15 to under-18 level.

In August 2021 it was announced that Ali had been called up to represent Djibouti in 2022 World Cup qualification matches against Algeria and Niger the following month. He debuted with Djibouti in a 4–2 loss to Niger on 6 September 2021, scoring the first goal in the game in the 32nd minute.

International goals
Scores and results list Djibouti's goal tally first.

International career statistics

References 

2000 births
Living people
Djiboutian footballers
Djibouti international footballers
Norwegian footballers
Norway youth international footballers
Norwegian people of Djiboutian descent
Association football midfielders
Fredrikstad FK players
Grorud IL players
Egersunds IK players
Moss FK players
Norwegian Second Division players
Norwegian First Division players